The Takitimu Mountains extend in a north–south direction southeast of Te Anau and Manapouri.

In Māori people mythology, the mountain range is special to Ngāi Tahu as it represents the upturned hull of the Tākitimu waka wrecked in Te Waewae Bay to the south of the Takitimu Mountains.

References

Mountain ranges of New Zealand
Landforms of Southland, New Zealand